Alas Leuser Airport is an airport located near Kutacane in Aceh, Indonesia.

Airlines and destinations

References

 Alas Leuser Airport
 (Indonesian) Runway Bandara Alas Leuser Diperpanjang 600 Meter
 Bandar Udara Alas Leuser - Kutacane - Indonesia Government Document

Airports in Aceh